Krešimir Ritz (born 28 June 1973) is a Croatian former professional tennis player.

Born in Zagreb, Ritz played professionally from the age of 15 and competed mostly in ITF level tournaments during his career. He however twice featured in the doubles main draw at Umag, with Marcelo Manola in 1995 and Ivo Karlović in 1996. At the age of 41 in 2014 he became the oldest player on tour with an ATP ranking.

Ritz's mother Neda is a well known television journalist in Croatia.

ITF Futures finals

Doubles: 18 (8–10)

References

External links
 
 

1973 births
Living people
Croatian male tennis players
Tennis players from Zagreb